Inna Mariam Patty popularly referred to as Inna Patty is a social entrepreneur and philanthropist who was named Miss Ghana 2004 and represented Ghana in Miss World 2005 at the Crown of Beauty Theatre in Sanya, China. She is the CEO of Exclusive Events Ghana, the current organizers of Miss Ghana.

Early life and education 
According to Ghanaweb, Patty was born in Lagos, Nigeria but raised in Ghana. She completed Wesley Girls High School and is an alumnus of the University of Ghana. She also graduated from the London School of Economics where she worked as a head-hunter at the London Stock Exchange.

Miss Ghana controversies
Patty has been involved in a lot of Miss Ghana controversy in the past where she had to sue Stephanie Karikari (Miss Ghana 2010), Antoinette Delali Kemavor (Miss Ghana 2015), and Giuseppina Nana Akua Baafi (Miss Ghana 2013) who claimed they were pimped to raise money for the pageant. She sued this three former queens for defamation of character.

Miss Ghana Foundation
Patty created the Miss Ghana Foundation to carry out philanthropic works in Ghana. The foundation supported an 8 year old girl suffering from scoliosis by paying for her full cost of surgery.

References

External links 

 

Miss World 2005 delegates
1983 births
Living people
Ghanaian beauty pageant winners